Félix Gaudin (10 February 1851 in Paris–15 September 1930 in Châtenoy-le-Royal) was a stained glass artist in France.  He was the father of Jean Gaudin and grandfather of Pierre Gaudin.

Gaudin was an early employer of Jean Baptiste Guth.

References

External links 
  Jean-François Luneau, Félix Gaudin, peintre verrier et mosaïste on Persée . 

1851 births
Artists from Paris
1930 deaths
French glass artists
Officiers of the Légion d'honneur
French stained glass artists and manufacturers